Kirsty Milczarek is a professional jockey, riding in thoroughbred horse races. She is of Polish descent but was born in the UK, where she is based in Newmarket.

Riding career

Kirsty Milczarek became involved in horse racing after leaving a successful career in showjumping. She is currently a successful freelance rider, with her own website at https://web.archive.org/web/20120619012319/http://www.kirsty-milczarek.com/ .

Kirsty rose to fame with a phenomenally successful winter in 2007/2008, where she rode 42 all-weather race winners between November and March. This took her to the Leading Apprentice title for the winter season, and to overall second-place behind Chris Catlin, and three winners ahead of Hayley Turner. In February 2008 Kirsty also gained fame when riding three winners on an afternoon, at Kempton Park Racecourse - this was the first time that this had been achieved by a female rider in the UK.

Kirsty Milczarek became of one of a small handful of female jockeys to achieve professional status in August 2008 by riding out her claim (a "claim" is the weight reduction given to the weight horses carry when ridden by less experienced riders; in the UK a claim is no longer assigned to a jockey once they have ridden 75 winners).

False accusations of corruption
On 20 May 2011 it was reported that Milczarek, along with three other jockeys and a trainer had "...intentionally failed to ensure that a horse ran on its merits...", and subsequently charged under the sport's anti-corruption rules. In December 2011 Milczarek was found guilty by the British Horseracing Authority and banned from riding for two years, but immediately lodged an appeal. On 10 April 2012, Milczarek's ban was overturned by the BHA's appeals panel after new evidence was presented. SInce this, Kirsty has returned to raceriding and has refound her previous success, including continuing to ride for Luca Cumani.

References

Living people
British people of Polish descent
British female jockeys
People from Newmarket, Suffolk
Year of birth missing (living people)